The Wörth Castle is a fortification in the Swiss municipality of Neuhausen am Rheinfall in the Canton of Schaffhausen.

Geography 

The water castle is located at the Rheinfall, built on a small island in the Rhein river at the municipality of Neuhausen am Rheinfall in the Canton of Schaffhausen, opposite of the Laufen Castle in the canton of Zürich. The Schlössli (twee for German Schloss, meaning castle) owes its name to the location on a small island, washed by the water of the Rheinfall, which used to be known as Werd, meaning literally a river island.

History 
Wörth was first mentioned in the 13th century AD, serving up to the middle of the 19th century as a major transhipment point on the east-west trade route, that led from Lake Constance and Basel, and was interrupted by the Rheinfall waterfalls.

The present castle was built in 1348 AD, according to the excavations by the archaeological team of the Canton of Schaffhausen in 2004. Like the predecessor building, which was built in the mid-11th century as Burg im Fischerhölzli, it served as a customs house and that to secure the area, where the goods were transferred to evade the Rheinfall. Earliest owner of the Habsurg fief were the Herren von Jestetten, followed by the Schultheiss of Randenburg (1291) and the Herren von Fulach (1422), and in 1429 by the Kloster Allerheiligen Schaffhausen. After the monastery's abolition in 1524, Wörth was a department (German: Amt) of the city of Schaffhausen.

In the late 1790s, a so-called Gertzler was the custodian of the then Schlösschen Wörth. It was given as a so-called "Schupf-Lehn" (fief) by the Kloster Allerheiligen Schaffhausen along with the salmon fisheries, customs, vineyard, forest etc. The Gertzler moved the customs for the monastery and had to deliver 2/3 of the salmon catch. For subsistence, he was allowed to fell timber out of the forest, and had to pay a lease of  30 Thaler per year for the use of the vineyard and the fields. The term "Schlupf-Lehn" derives from the Swiss German word for "slide out", as the feudal hereditary could be revoked if the administrator did not meet its obligations to the monastery.

When the railway was built, the water traffic route lost its importance, and the Canton of Schaffhausen rebuilt the building as a restaurant in 1835/36. The former customs station and Salmon farming was converted in the tourism promotional restaurant «Caffé- und Speisewirtschaft Schlösschen Wörth», that was opened on 2 February 1837 (Candlemas). The construction costs for the renovation had to be paid by the former owner, the Allerheiligen Abbey in Schaffhausen.

Architecture 
A bridge was leading from the righthand shore of the Rhein river into the ring the walled courtyard. On the north side a palace-like building was built, whose third floor consisted of a cantilevered clerestory timbered. In 1621 a stone floor replaced the clerestory. New floors were added, new windows broken, and the ring wall and gate was broken. As of today it houses the restaurant Schlössli Wörth that claims to be a gourmet restaurant, and also a gift shop and a fast food joint, connected with a terrace and a brilliant view of Rheinfall. Wörth is also the starting point of the Rheinfall tour boats.

Trivia 
The castle was mentioned in the diary of Goethe on 18 September 1797, Schlösschen Wörth: Ich ging hinein, um ein Glas Wein zu trinken. Alter Eindruck bey Erblickung des Mannes ... Goethe asked the custodian (Gertzler) about his work and documented the then conditions.

Cultural heritage 
The building is listed in the Swiss inventory of cultural property of national and regional significance as a Class B object of regional importance.

References

External links 

 Website of the restaurant Schlössli Wörth 
 

Castles in the canton of Schaffhausen
Tourist attractions in the canton of Schaffhausen
Neuhausen am Rheinfall
Restaurants in Switzerland
River islands of Switzerland
Islands of the Rhine
Water castles in Switzerland
Cultural property of regional significance in Switzerland